The 1988–89 Algerian Championnat National was the 27th season of the Algerian Championnat National since its establishment in 1962. A total of 16 teams contested the league, with Mouloudia d'Oran as the defending champions, The Championnat started on September 22, 1988. and ended on June 1, 1989.

Team summaries

Promotion and relegation 
Teams promoted from Algerian Division 2 1988–1989 
 Entente de Sétif
 Jeunesse de Belcourt

Teams relegated to Algerian Division 2 1989–1990
 Union d'Aïn Béïda
 Entente de Collo

League table

Season statistics

Top scorers

References

External links
1988–89 Algerian Championnat National

Algerian Championnat National
Championnat National
Algerian Ligue Professionnelle 1 seasons